70 Squadron or 70th Squadron may refer to:

 No. 70 Squadron RAAF, a unit of the Royal Australian Air Force
 70th Squadron (Iraq), a unit of the Iraqi Air Force
 No. 70 Squadron RAF, a unit of the United Kingdom Royal Air Force 
 70th Fighter Squadron, a unit of the United States